Public Broadcasting Services Limited (PBS) is the public broadcaster of Malta. PBS is funded by government grants and the sale of commercial airtime. Its TVM channel is Malta's most watched television channel, and its radio station Magic Malta enjoys huge popularity among local and tourist listeners.

History
PBS was founded on November 11, 1975 as Xandir Malta and became joint member of the European Broadcasting Union (EBU) together with the Maltese Broadcasting Authority (MBA). The latter was previously admitted as a full, active member, as Malta Television Service Ltd already has been, in 1970. Since 2003, PBS is the sole Maltese member of EBU.

Prior to Xandir Malta, Rediffusion broadcast television programmes in Malta under the name The Malta Television Service Ltd. The service was run by Rediffusion, a London-based independent broadcaster. Transmissions in Malta started from Hamrun on 11 November 1935 under the name of "Broadcast Relay Service Malta Ltd." Charles Whotcroft and George Powler were the first manager and chief engineer respectively. On 29 September 1962 Rediffusion (Malta) Ltd. inaugurated a television service covering the Maltese islands.  On 14 February 1975 the employees of the Rediffusion (Malta) Ltd staged a sit-in strike at the company's premises in Malta and they even started to run the company. On 30 July 1975 an agreement was reached between Rediffusion Group of Companies and the Dom Mintoff led Labour Party government of Malta for the transfer of all Rediffusion's assets in Malta to the Maltese government.

Following the transition to digital television using the DVB-T standard in October 2011, all licensed terrestrial channels in Malta are distributed through a network of transmitters operated by PBS. These transmitters are located in Delimara (Marsaxlokk), Nadur, Mellieħa, Mtarfa, Naxxar and Portomaso (St. Julian's).

PBS is managed by a Board of Directors. The current Executive Charmain is Mark Sammut. Charles Dalli is the Chief Operations Officer. In 2021, they announced that the TV channels will change their logos but one changed a name as well.

Services

Radio 
PBS' radio services consist of the Radju Malta, Radju Malta 2 and Magic Malta radio stations.

For a short period in 1975/1976 it also had an Italian-language station, called Radio Malta Tre; the news were read by Anna Bonanno.

Television 
PBS' television services consist of the TVM and TVMNews+ television channels. It also operates the Parliament TV service under an agreement with the Parliament of Malta.

References

External links 

  

Television in Malta
Publicly funded broadcasters
European Broadcasting Union members
Multilingual broadcasters
Television channels and stations established in 1975
State media